John Dick was a Scottish amateur football wing half who played in the Scottish League for Queen's Park and Motherwell.

Personal life 
Dick served as a sapper in the Royal Engineers during the First World War.

References 

Scottish footballers
Scottish Football League players
British Army personnel of World War I
Royal Engineers soldiers
Association football wing halves
Queen's Park F.C. players
Date of death missing
St Mirren F.C. players
Motherwell F.C. players